The 1994 Fort Lauderdale Kicks season was the first and only season and of the new team in the United States Interregional Soccer League.  This year, the team finished in sixth place in the Southeast division.  They did not make the playoffs.  After the Fort Lauderdale Strikers club folded the team in the American Professional Soccer League in 1994, the Fort Lauderdale Kicks and the Strikers joined forces.  The following year the name Fort Lauderdale Kicks were folded and a new Fort Lauderdale Strikers team was fielded in the USISL.

Background

Review

Competitions

United States Interregional Soccer League (USISL) regular season

Schedule
Each team had a 20-game schedule, with two games counting as Designated Makeup Games (DMGs).  DMGs are plugged in for any game that was cancelled during the season.

Scoring
Teams in the Northeast and Midwest have points that reflect the addition of a 1-point corner kick bonus per game.  The standings published by the USISL list only the wins, losses, goals scored, goals allowed and total points.  They do not provide the number of wins or losses that came through shootouts.  They also do not provide the number of bonus points coming from goals or corner kicks.

 Regulation win = 6 points
 Shootout win (SW) = 4 points
 Shootout loss (SL) = 2 points
 Regulation loss = 0 points
 Bonus points (BP): An additional one-point per goal up to a maximum of three points per game.
 Northeast Division and Midwest Division teams received one point per corner kick each game.

Northeast Division

Atlantic Division

Southeast Division

Midwest Division

Midsouth Division

South Central Division

Southwest Division

Pacific Division

Results summaries

Results by round

Match reports

United States Interregional Soccer League (USISL) Playoffs

Bracket

Match reports

Statistics

Transfers

References 

1994
Fort Lauderdale Strikers
Fort Lauderdale Kicks